A number of steamships were named Beothic, including:

 , a Norwegian sealing ship in service 1909–29
 , a Canadian cargo ship in service 1925–40

Ship names